Eun-chae, also spelled Eun-chay, or Eun-cheh, Un-chae, is a Korean feminine given name. Its meaning differs based on the hanja used to write each syllable of the name. There are 26 hanja with the reading "eun" and 17 hanja with the reading "chae" on the South Korean government's official list of hanja which may be registered for use in given names.

People
People with this name include:

Jung Eun-chae (born 1986), South Korean actress
Song Eun-chae (born 1986), South Korean actress
Seon Eun-chae (born 1993), member of the South Korea women's national rugby sevens team

Fictional characters
Fictional characters with this name include:

Song Eun-chae, in 2004 South Korean television series I'm Sorry, I Love You
Byeon Eun-chae, in 2008 South Korean television series Iljimae

See also
List of Korean given names

References

Korean feminine given names